This article presents a list of the historical events and publications of Australian literature during 1877.

Books 

 Rolf Boldrewood — Babes in the Bush
 Maud Jean Franc — Little Mercy
 Henry Kingsley — The Mystery of the Island
 Catherine Martin — The Moated Grange : An Original Tale

Poetry 

 Henry Kendall — "Ode to a Black Gin"
 Emily Manning — The Balance of Pain and Other Poems
 James Brunton Stephens — "The Dominion"

Short stories 

 Marcus Clarke
 Four Stories High
 "The Future Australian Race"
 "The Romance of Lively Creek"

Births 

 17 January — May Gibbs, writer for children (died 1969)
 28 July — Emily Bulcock, poet and dramatist (died 1969)

See also 
 1877 in poetry
 List of years in literature
 List of years in Australian literature
 1877 in literature
 1876 in Australian literature
 1877 in Australia
 1878 in Australian literature

References

Literature
Australian literature by year
19th-century Australian literature
1877 in literature